Northgate Capital is a venture capital and private equity investment firm with approximately $4.9 billion of assets under management and offices in San Francisco, Danville, Mexico City and London. Northgate was founded in 2000 by Brent Jones and Tommy Vardell following their retirement from the National Football League. In 2010, Jones and Vardell sold a majority stake in Northgate to Religare Enterprises, an Indian financial services company, and continued to manage the firm as Partners. In 2016, Religare and Northgate's management team sold 100% ownership of Northgate to The Capital Partnership, a private investment firm, with offices in London and Dubai. Following the acquisition by TCP, both Jones and Vardell transitioned to the role of Founders and Senior Advisors to Northgate.

References 

Financial services companies established in 2000
Venture capital firms of the United States